The following fungal families have not been taxonomically classified in any of the classes or orders accepted in the current classification of the Ascomycota with a high degree of probability (incertae sedis):
Alinaceae 
Amorphothecaceae
Aphanopsidaceae
Aspidotheliaceae
Batistiaceae
Coniocybaceae
Diporothecaceae
Eoterfeziaceae
Epigloeaceae
Hispidicarpomycetaceae
Koralionastetaceae
Lautosporaceae
Mucomassariaceae
Phyllobatheliaceae
Pleurotremataceae
Pseudeurotiaceae
Saccardiaceae
Seuratiaceae
Strangosporaceae
Thelocarpaceae
Xanthopyreniaceae

References

 Families